Sean Jamison (born 27 January 1990) is a South African cricketer who played for the Highveld Lions cricket team. He was the leading wicket-taker in the 2017–18 Sunfoil 3-Day Cup for Gauteng, with 32 dismissals in eight matches. He was also the leading wicket-taker for Gauteng in the 2018–19 CSA 3-Day Provincial Cup, with 37 dismissals in seven matches. In April 2021, he was named in Border's squad, ahead of the 2021–22 cricket season in South Africa.

References

External links
 

1990 births
Living people
South African cricketers
Gauteng cricketers
Lions cricketers
People from Springs, Gauteng
Sportspeople from Gauteng